The 1899 Brooklyn Superbas season was the 16th season of the current-day Dodgers franchise and the 9th season in the National League. The team won the National League pennant with a record of 101–47, 8 games ahead of the Boston Beaneaters, after finishing tenth in 1898.

Offseason 
The 1899 season began with the Brooklyn team and the Baltimore Orioles merging their ownership groups. Baltimore owner Harry Von der Horst and Ned Hanlon became part owners of Brooklyn. Von der Horst insisted that Hanlon become the team's new manager, a position that had been promised to outfielder Mike Griffin, who had been interim manager the previous year. Griffin quit and wound up suing the team for lost wages. His contract was sold to the Cleveland Spiders, but Griffin never played or managed in the majors again.

Renamed the Superbas as part of the deal, the team also siphoned off several of the Orioles' best players. On March 11, the team brought Bill Dahlen, Mike Heydon, Jay Hughes, Hughie Jennings, Willie Keeler, Joe Kelley, Al Maul, Dan McGann and Doc McJames onto their roster from Baltimore, while assigning Harry Howell, Candy LaChance, Kit McKenna, Ralph Miller, Jack Ryan, Jimmy Sheckard and Aleck Smith to the Orioles. This influx of talent was a good part of the reason why the Superbas won the National League pennant with 101 wins after winning just 54 games in 1898.

Notable transactions 
 March 11, 1899: Mike Griffin was sold by the Superbas to the Cleveland Spiders.

Regular season

Season standings

Record vs. opponents

Notable transactions 
 April 4, 1899: Pat Crisham and George Magoon were traded by the Superbas to the Baltimore Orioles for Aleck Smith.
 April 10, 1899: Dan McFarlan was assigned to the Superbas by the Baltimore Orioles.
 April 25, 1899: Pete Cassidy, Mike Heydon, Dan McFarlan and cash were traded by the Superbas to the Washington Senators for Doc Casey and Duke Farrell.
 July 14, 1899: Dan McGann and Aleck Smith were traded by the Superbas to the Washington Senators for Deacon McGuire.
 August 3, 1899: Hughie Jennings was traded by the Superbas to the Baltimore Orioles for Gene DeMontreville and Jerry Nops.
 August 8, 1899: Gene DeMontreville and Jerry Nops were traded by the Superbas back to the Orioles for Hughie Jennings, undoing the trade of August 3.

Roster

Player stats

Batting

Starters by position 
Note: Pos = Position; G = Games played; AB = At bats; R = Runs; H = Hits; Avg. = Batting average; HR = Home runs; RBI = Runs batted in; SB = Stolen bases

Other batters 
Note: G = Games played; AB = At bats; R = Runs; H = Hits; Avg. = Batting average; HR = Home runs; RBI = Runs batted in; SB = Stolen bases

Pitching

Starting pitchers 
Note: G = Games pitched; GS = Games started; CG = Complete games; IP = Innings pitched; W = Wins; L = Losses; ERA = Earned run average; BB = Bases on balls; SO = Strikeouts

Other pitchers 
Note: G = Games pitched; GS = Games started; CG = Complete games; IP = Innings pitched; W = Wins; L = Losses; ERA = Earned run average; BB = Bases on balls; SO = Strikeouts

Relief pitchers 
Note: G = Games pitched; IP = Innings pitched; W = Wins; L = Losses; SV = Saves; ERA = Earned run average; BB = Bases on balls; SO = Strikeouts

Notes

References 
Baseball-Reference season page
Baseball Almanac season page

External links 
Brooklyn Dodgers reference site
Acme Dodgers page 
Retrosheet

Los Angeles Dodgers seasons
Brooklyn Superbas season
National League champion seasons
Brooklyn
19th century in Brooklyn
Park Slope